The Delegation of the European Union to Canada is located in Ottawa, Ontario, Canada. It was established to facilitate relations between the European Union and Canada. It opened in 1976 and was originally located at 45 O'Connor Street before moving to a new location at 150 Metcalfe Street.

Though not officially an embassy, the head of the mission is given rank and courtesy title of ambassador within Canadian law. The Delegation has three sections: Economic and Trade; Political and Public Affairs; and Administration.

See also
 Canada and the European Union

References 
Delegation of the European Union to Canada

European Union
Canada
Canada–European Union relations